Madge Stuart (5 August 1895, in Holmesfield, Derbyshire – 10 October 1958, in Monte Carlo, Monaco) was a British actress of the silent era. She married Dion Titheradge in 1928.

Selected filmography
 Nature's Gentleman (1918)
 The Elusive Pimpernel (1919)
 The Tavern Knight (1920)
 The Amateur Gentleman (1920)
 The Iron Stair (1920)
 Gwyneth of the Welsh Hills (1921)
 Frailty (1921)
 Innocent (1921)
 General John Regan (1921)
 His Wife's Husband (1922)
 The Scourge (1922)
 Running Water (1922)
 The Knight Errant (1922)
 The Passionate Friends (1922)
 A Gamble with Hearts (1923)
 Around a Million (1924)
 The Uninvited Guest (1923)
 Women and Diamonds (1924)
 The Only Way (1927)

References

External links

1895 births
1958 deaths
English film actresses
English silent film actresses
People from North East Derbyshire District
20th-century English actresses